Basudeb Chap is a village of Gosairhat Upazila under Shariatpur District in the Dhaka Division of southern-central Bangladesh.

See also 
Gosairhat Upazila

References

Shariatpur District
Populated places in Barisal District